Dan Engelstad is an American college basketball coach, and current head coach of the Mount St. Mary's Mountaineers men's basketball team.

Playing career
Engelstad played college basketball at Division III St. Mary's College of Maryland, where he graduated as the school's all-time leader in assists.

Coaching career
Upon graduation, Engelstad joined Milan Brown's staff at Mount St. Mary's where he was on staff for the Mountaineers' 2008 NCAA tournament team. He followed Brown as an assistant coach at Holy Cross in 2010, where he stayed until 2013 when he accepted the head coaching position at Southern Vermont.

Inheriting a program that was 1–24 before he took over, Engelstad led the Mountaineers to a 16–10 overall record, including wins over a nationally ranked Williams featuring Duncan Robinson. The following season, Engelstad guided Southern Vermont to a NECC regular season title, its best record in program history with a 25–4 record, and its first-ever appearance in the ECAC Division III New England Basketball tournament, capturing the school's first ECAC title of any kind.

The following season, Southern Vermont won both the NECC regular season and tournament title with a perfect 16–0 mark in conference play, and a 24–4 overall record en route to the school's second-ever NCAA Tournament appearance. Following a 17–10 overall record in the 2016–17 season and another NECC regular season title, Engelstad coached the Mountaineers to its fourth-straight NECC regular season title, its second conference tournament title and an appearance in the 2018 NCAA Division III tournament. With a 104–34 overall record in five seasons, Engelstad is the all-time wins leader in Southern Vermont basketball history.

Engelstad also served as the head coach for Armored Athlete in The Basketball Tournament 2017, helping the team reach the West Regional Final.

On May 9, 2018, Engelstad was named the 22nd head coach in Mount St. Mary's history, replacing Jamion Christian who left for the head coaching job at Siena.

Head coaching record

NCAA DIII

NCAA DI

References

Year of birth missing (living people)
Living people
American men's basketball coaches
American men's basketball players
Basketball coaches from Maryland
Basketball players from Maryland
Holy Cross Crusaders men's basketball coaches
Mount St. Mary's Mountaineers men's basketball coaches
People from Bethesda, Maryland
Southern Vermont Mountaineers men's basketball coaches
St. Mary's Seahawks men's basketball players